Zain Imam is an Indian actor who predominantly works in Hindi television. He is best known for his portrayal of Neil Khanna in Star Plus show Naamkaran  and Yuvraj Luthra in Zee TV's Tashan-E-Ishq which earned him Gold Awards for Best Actor in Negative Role. In 2019, Imam participated in Colors TV's stunt-based reality show Khatron Ke Khiladi 9.

He was last seen portraying the role of Agastya Raichand in Colors TV's Fanaa: Ishq Mein Marjawan until August 2022.

Career

Early career and success (2014–2017) 
Imam started his career as a model, working for agencies such as Aldo Group, and also did few TV commercials before debuting in Hindi television. His first work as an actor came with MTV India television series Kaisi Yeh Yaariaan where he played Abhimanyu Thakkar.

From 2015 to 2016, he played a grey-shaded character of Yuvraj Luthra in Zee TV's love triangle Tashan-e-Ishq opposite Jasmin Bhasin. The show proved a breakout for him, he won the Gold Award for Best Actor in a Negative Role.

Then, he was cast as Abir Dharmadhikari, new male lead of Zee TV's Yeh Vaada Raha when it took a large leap, from October 2016 to January 2017.

Establishment and other projects (2017–2021) 

Imam got his biggest success when he was introduced as ACP Neil Khanna in StarPlus's romantic-drama Naamkarann along with Aditi Rathore after a generation leap. The show wrapped up in May 2018.

After doing an episodic in &TV's Laal Ishq with Mahhi Vij, Imam entered the popular StarPlus's series Ishqbaaaz as Mohit Malhotra, a full-fledged antagonist in September 2018.

Venturing into reality shows, Imam made his debut in reality with participated in the adventure stunt-based show Fear Factor: Khatron Ke Khiladi 9 in 2019 where he finished at 9th place.

His subsequent fictional role as Kabir Mittal, a former army officer in StarPlus' mystery revenge drama Ek Bhram Sarvagun Sampanna failed to impress audience. He was next seen in the music video Tanhaai by Tulsi Kumar under T-Series in 2020.

In 2021, Imam progressed into digital platform with the web series Crashh portrayed Dr. Rishabh Sachdeva co-starring Rohan Mehra, Kunj Anand, Aditi Sharma and Anushka Sen.

Television comeback (2022–present) 
Imam returned to television after a long break of 3 years with his role of Agastya Raichand an obsessive/possessive lover, the main protagonist in Gul Khan production Fanaa: Ishq Mein Marjawan on Colors TV opposite Reem Shaikh. for which he received praise from audience. The show ended on 2 September 2022.

In the media 
He was appeared in the Times of India's Top 20 "Most Desirable Men" list rank at No. 5 in 2018 and at No. 15 in 2019.

Filmography

Television

Web series

Music videos

Awards and nominations

See also
 List of Indian television actors

References

External links

Indian male television actors
Living people
Indian male models
Male actors from Delhi
Indian male soap opera actors
Male actors in Hindi television
21st-century Indian male actors
Fear Factor: Khatron Ke Khiladi participants
Year of birth missing (living people)